Trevine is a hamlet 2 km east of St Minver in north Cornwall, England, United Kingdom.

References

Hamlets in Cornwall